Richard James McMahon (born 1962) is a British barrister who has served as Bailiff of Guernsey since 2020.

Early life
Born in 1962, McMahon was educated at Abingdon School from 1973-1980, before he went to study Law at the University of Liverpool and University of Cambridge (Emmanuel College). Further education was at the Inns of Court School of Law in London and the Universite de Caen in France.

Career
McMahon was called to the English Bar, Middle Temple in 1986 and lectured in law at the University of Reading from 1987 to 1995. He became a Guernsey barrister in 1998 before being appointed a Crown Advocate in 2008. The following year he was appointed Solicitor General and Queen's Counsel.

McMahon was appointed to the office of Deputy Bailiff of Guernsey in 2012.

In May 2020 McMahon was sworn in and became the 90th Bailiff of Guernsey, taking over the position of Bailiff from Sir Richard Collas. The Bailiff of Guernsey is ex-officio President of the Guernsey Court of Appeal and the President of the Court of Appeal and sits as a judge in both that court and the Royal Court.

See also

 Courts of Guernsey
 List of Bailiffs of Guernsey

References

Bailiffs of Guernsey
People educated at Abingdon School
Living people
1962 births
Alumni of Emmanuel College, Cambridge